Jugal Kishore may refer to: 

Jugal Kishore (physician) (1915–2012), Indian homoeopathic physician
Jugal Kishore (UP politician) (born 1959), Indian Uttar Pradesh politician
Jugal Kishore Birla (1883–1967), Indian philanthropist
Jugal Kishore Choudhury, Indian architect and urban planner
Jugal Kishore Sharma (born 1962), Indian politician
Thakur Jugal Kishore Sinha (1908–1980), Indian politician

See also
Amdanga Jugal Kishore Mahavidyalaya, a college in West Bengal, India
 Kishore (name)